Since 1972, Northwestern Medicine Marianjoy Rehabilitation Hospital, a 125-bed inpatient hospital in Wheaton, Illinois, has been dedicated to physical medicine and rehabilitation.

Marianjoy Rehabilitation Hospital specializes in rehabilitation for adults and children who have experienced a stroke, brain injury, spinal cord injury, orthopaedic or musculoskeletal conditions, or a neuromuscular disorder or condition.

Marianjoy offers comprehensive inpatient, outpatient, and day rehabilitation services and physician clinics to patients throughout the Chicago area. The comprehensive inpatient program includes a team of rehabilitation experts who help patients and their families on their journey back to wellness after an injury or illness. The team includes physiatrists, rehabilitation nurses, therapists, and other medical professionals.

Marianjoy incorporates advanced technology and the latest evidence-based treatment to achieve the best possible outcomes for each patient.

Marianjoy’s commitment to providing expert physical medicine and rehabilitation is validated through accreditations from highly respected national organizations. These include Accreditation by the Joint Commission, having achieved the Disease-Specific Care Certification for Stroke Rehabilitation. Marianjoy is also accredited by the Commission on Accreditation of Rehabilitation Facilities (CARF) for inpatient rehabilitation.

References

Hospital buildings completed in 1972
Hospitals in Illinois
Buildings and structures in Wheaton, Illinois
Hospitals established in 1972
1972 establishments in Illinois
Franciscan hospitals
Catholic hospitals in North America
Rehabilitation hospitals
Northwestern Medicine